is an artificial island, the oldest in Japan, now in ruins. The name means "Waka Bay Island" from Waka, Zaimokuza's old name (see the text of the commemorative stele, below). Its remains are located at the east end of Zaimokuza Beach near Kamakura and are still visible at low tide. It was built in 1232 and, in spite of its state of disrepair, it has been declared a national Historic Site because it is the sole surviving example of an artificial harbor from the Kamakura period.

Although its component stones have sunk in the sand, its general contour is still clearly visible when the tide is low as a mound about 200m long. On its northern side there used to be several stone pillars used to moor ships in port call to avoid strong southern winds, but they are now all lost.

On the beach, a large rock surmounted by a black stele marks the position of the former port. The stele, erected by the Kamakuramachi Seinendan (Kamakura Youth Club) in 1924, explains in Japanese the history of the site and its importance.

History
During the Kamakura shogunate, Sagami Bay was busy with trading ships, but the shallowness of the bay made the use of barges indispensable.  Accidents between ships were common and it was therefore decided to build a port. A priest named  applied for permission from the Shogunate to build an artificial port in the area.  Permission was granted in 1232.

In its first form, the harbor functioned as both a breakwater and a wharf and was built with large stones laid as a foundation, with smaller stones on top. It was later extended gradually and repaired several times until the end of the Edo period, when it was abandoned.

Text on the stele 
The original inscription is in old-fashioned Japanese. Here follows a translation of the text based on the transcription in modern Japanese provided by the Kamakura Citizen Net .

"Waka" is the former name of today's Zaimokuza. This place used to be a harbor where timber was collected and shipped and, for this reason, the town's name changed soon to the present one.
Wakae Island was an embankment built to avoid the destruction by the waves of Waka's harbor. 768 years ago, a priest named Oamidabutsu asked permission for its building and, with the support of Moritsuna, work was started on July 15th and ended on August 9th.
Erected in March 1924 – The Kamakura Youth Club

References
 "Wakaejima" from the Japanese version of Wikipedia accessed on April 4, 2008
 Kamakura: History & Historic Sites, by the Kamakura Citizen Net accessed on April 4, 2008

External links 

 About WakaeJima Photos of Wakae Island's full profile in occasion of an exceptionally low tide (site in Japanese) accessed on April 4, 2008
 Wakaejima Original text and its transcription with photo of Wakae Island's commemorative stele (site in Japanese) accessed on April 4, 2008

Kamakura, Kanagawa
Artificial islands of Japan
Islands of Kanagawa Prefecture